Raptor Lake is Intel's codename for the 13th-generation of Intel Core processors based on a hybrid architecture, utilizing Raptor Cove performance cores and Gracemont efficient cores. Raptor Lake launched on October 20, 2022. Mobile versions are expected to be released by the end of the year. Like Alder Lake, Raptor Lake is fabricated using Intel's Intel 7 process. At Intel's Investor Meeting 2022, it was confirmed that Raptor Lake would feature up to 24 cores (8 performance cores plus 16 efficient cores) and 32 threads and is socket compatible with Alder Lake systems (LGA 1700).

The company spokesman revealed that Raptor Lake was created to benefit from process improvements before Meteor Lake arrives since the next microarchitecture was likely to be delayed.

On January, 3rd, 2023 at CES 2023 Intel announced new desktop Raptor Lake CPUs and mobile CPUs, including a new line-up called N-Series processors which include only energy efficient cores.

Raptor Lake competes with the AMD Ryzen 7000 series that was launched about one month earlier on September 27, 2022.

Features

CPU 

 Cores
 Up to 8 Raptor Cove performance cores (P-core)
 Up to 16 Gracemont efficient cores (E-core)
 L2 cache for the P-core increased to 2 MB and for the E-core cluster to 4 MB
 Up to 36 MB L3 cache

I/O 
 Up to DDR5-5600
 Z790 chipset improvements
 Up to 20 PCIe 4.0 / PCIe 5.0 lanes
 Up to 5 USB 3.2 Gen 2×2 (20GBit) ports

Package 
 Third-generation Intel SuperFin transistors
 Increased P- and E-cores maximum frequencies
Increased power efficiency

List of 13th generation Raptor Lake processors

Desktop processors (Raptor Lake-S) 
On September 27, 2022 at their Innovation event, Intel officially revealed six unlocked Raptor Lake SKUs launching for desktop on October 20, 2022. At the event, Intel CEO Pat Gelsinger confirmed that the then-upcoming highest-end Raptor Lake SKU, the 13900KS, could hit up to 6.0 GHz at stock configuration and would debut in 2023.

Common features of Raptor Lake desktop CPUs:
 Socket: LGA 1700.
 RAM support in actual computers vary depending on the motherboard and chipset
 All CPUs support up to 128 GB of RAM and up to 192 GB of DDR5 on selected MSI and ASUS motherboards
 All CPUs support up to DDR4-3200 or DDR5-4800 in dual-channel mode
 The i5-13600 K/KF and all higher tier CPUs also support DDR5-5200 and DDR5-5600
 All CPUs support up to 20 (1x16+4 or 2x8+4) PCI Express lanes
 Models without the F suffix feature either of the following integrated UHD Graphics GPUs, all with base frequency of 300 MHz:
 UHD Graphics 770 with 32 EUs,
 UHD Graphics 730 with 24 EUs
 Max Turbo Power: the maximum sustained (> 1 s) power dissipation of the processor as limited by current and/or temperature controls. Instantaneous power may exceed Maximum Turbo Power for short durations (≤ 10 ms). Maximum Turbo Power is configurable by system vendor and can be system specific.
 CPUs in bold below feature ECC memory support only when paired with a motherboard based on the W680 chipset. Other SKUs do not support ECC memory at all.

Mobile processors

Raptor Lake-HX

Raptor Lake-H

Raptor Lake-P

Raptor Lake-U

References 

Intel x86 microprocessors
X86 microarchitectures